Nick van der Lijke (born 23 September 1991) is a Dutch racing cyclist, who currently rides for UCI Continental team .

Nick van der Lijke is married to Dutch former professional cyclist Nicky Zijlaard. When he didn't get a new contract for 2022, the couple took over the Zijlaard family business. A few months later they handed the Croissanterie back to Nicky's parents, and Nick got back to racing.

Major results

2010
 10th Rund um den Finanzplatz Eschborn-Frankfurt U23
2011
 7th Grand Prix des Marbriers
 9th Overall Tour of Norway
 10th Ronde van Midden-Nederland
2012
 1st  Overall Tour de Gironde
1st Young rider classification
1st Stage 1
 1st Mountains classification Boucles de la Mayenne
 4th Omloop der Kempen
 6th Overall Tour de Bretagne
 8th Overall Tour of China I
 9th Overall Ronde de l'Oise
2013
 1st  Overall Kreiz Breizh Elites
1st  Points classification
1st  Young rider classification
1st Stage 2 (ITT)
 1st Beverbeek Classic
 2nd Overall Tour de Bretagne
1st  Young rider classification
 3rd Overall Tour de Gironde
1st Young rider classification
 3rd Grand Prix de la Somme
 6th Overall Le Triptyque des Monts et Châteaux
 6th Overall Olympia's Tour
 6th Ronde van Vlaanderen U23
 7th Paris–Tours Espoirs
 8th Dorpenomloop Rucphen
 9th Ronde van Overijssel
 10th Ronde van Zeeland Seaports
2014
 9th Overall Tour of Hainan
2015
 7th Dwars door Drenthe
 10th Ronde van Drenthe
2016
 3rd Overall Tour des Fjords
1st  Young rider classification
2017
 3rd Volta Limburg Classic
 9th Overall Tour des Fjords
2018
 1st  Derny, UEC European Track Championships
 9th Overall Okolo Slovenska
 10th Overall Deutschland Tour
2019
 3rd Veenendaal–Veenendaal Classic
 10th Overall Tour de Yorkshire
 10th Druivenkoers Overijse
2020
 8th Druivenkoers Overijse
2021
 1st  Overall Kreiz Breizh Elites
 4th Overall Danmark Rundt
 4th Skive–Løbet
 5th Overall Tour de Bretagne
1st  Points classification
 8th GP Herning
2022
 1st Omloop van de Braakman

References

External links
 

1991 births
Living people
Dutch male cyclists
People from Middelburg, Zeeland
Cyclists from Zeeland
European Games competitors for the Netherlands
Cyclists at the 2015 European Games
21st-century Dutch people